Edwin Andre Astwood (born 24 August 1973) is a politician from the Turks and Caicos Islands who has been Leader of the Opposition since February 2021 and Leader of the PDM party since June 2021. He served as Minister of Health, Agriculture and Human Services from 2016 to 2021. Astwood has been a Member of Parliament for Grand Turk South & Salt Cay since November 2012. He is the son of one of the founders of the People's Democratic Movement (PDM), Lewis Edwin Astwood III.

Leadership of the People's Democratic Movement 
Following the landslide victory of the PNP in the 2021 election, Astwood was the only candidate of his party to win his seat in the House of Assembly. Then Premier and Astwood's party leader, Sharlene Cartwright-Robinson stepped down as party leader in the days following and her deputy, Sean Astwood became the acting party leader until the party would be able to elect a leader at their next convention. Sean Astwood later announced his own resignation from leadership of the paper in June 2021. After some weeks of uncertainty, at a virtual convention held on 26 June 2021, Edwin Astwood, Leader of the Opposition was appointed as the new leader of the PDM.

References

1973 births
Living people
Turks and Caicos Islands politicians
People's Democratic Movement (Turks and Caicos Islands) politicians
Members of the Turks and Caicos Islands House of Assembly
Government ministers of the Turks and Caicos Islands
Nova Southeastern University alumni